David L. Katz (born February 20, 1963) is an American physician. He was the founding director of the Yale-Griffin Prevention Research Center that was founded at Griffin Hospital in Derby, Connecticut in 1998.

Career
Previously, Katz was a clinical instructor in medicine at the Yale School of Medicine. Katz formerly served as associate director for nutrition science at the Rudd Center for Food Policy and Obesity at Yale, following his appointment in 2005. Although Yale-Griffin Prevention Research Center is part of the Yale School of Public Health, Katz has not had an academic appointment with Yale since 2016 and is no longer academically affiliated with the university. Katz has authored over 100 scientific papers and written newspaper and magazine articles, including a recurring column in O: The Oprah Magazine starting in March 2002 and later discontinued. In 2000, Katz founded the Integrative Medicine Center at Griffin, which ceased operating in November 2014. Katz is a contributor and advisory board member for Naked Food Magazine.

In 2015, Katz wrote two positive reviews in his Huffington Post blog for a science fiction book that he had published under a pseudonym, without disclosing that he was the author of the book; Huffington Post retracted the posts. 
In March 2020, Katz was invited by John Ioannidis to join in a proposed meeting intended to convince President Donald Trump not to employ lockdown measures during the COVID-19 pandemic; however, the meeting ultimately did not take place. Katz is a co-signatory of the Great Barrington Declaration.

His book How to Eat: All Your Food and Diet Questions Answered, coauthored with food journalist Mark Bittman, was published in 2020.

Education
Katz received a BA degree from Dartmouth College, an MD degree from the Albert Einstein College of Medicine, and an MPH degree from Yale School of Public Health. He is board certified in preventive medicine.

Selected publications
 Hartwig, K.A., Dunville, R.L., Kim, M.H., Levy, B., Zaharek, M.M., Yanchou Njike, V., and Katz, D.L. Promoting Healthy People 2010 through Small Grants. Health Promotion Practice 2009, Volume: 10 issue: 1, page(s): 24–33, epub November 16, 2006. https://doi.org/10.1177/1524839906289048
 Katz, D.L., O'Connell, M., Yeh, M.C., Nawaz, H., Njike, V., Anderson, L.M., Cory, S., and Dietz, W. Public Health Strategies for Preventing and Controlling Overweight and Obesity in School and Worksite Settings: A Report on Recommendations of the Task Force on Community Preventive Services. Morbidity and Mortality Weekly Report 54(RR-10): 1–12, 2005.
 Katz, D.L. Lifestyle and Dietary Modification for Prevention of Heart Failure. Medical Clinics of North America 88(5): 1295–1320, 2004.

See also
 Juice Plus

References

External links

 
 Real Lives of Practicing Internists Profile of Katz

1963 births
Living people
Dartmouth College alumni
Albert Einstein College of Medicine alumni
Yale School of Public Health alumni
People from Los Angeles